The Enneagram of Personality, or simply the Enneagram (from the Greek words  [, meaning "nine"] and  [, meaning something "written" or "drawn"]), is a description of the human psyche. It is principally understood and taught by its proponents as a typology of nine interconnected personality types. 

Although the origins and history of many of the ideas associated with the Enneagram of Personality are disputed, contemporary approaches are principally derived from the teachings of the Bolivian psycho-spiritual teacher Oscar Ichazo from the 1950s and the Chilean psychiatrist Claudio Naranjo from the 1970s. Naranjo's theories were also influenced by some earlier teachings about personality by George Gurdjieff and the Fourth Way tradition. 

As a typology, the Enneagram defines nine personality types (sometimes called "enneatypes"), which are represented by the points of a geometric figure called an enneagram, which indicate connections between the types. There are some different schools of thought among Enneagram teachers and their understandings are not always in agreement.

The Enneagram of Personality has been promoted in both business management and spirituality contexts through seminars, conferences, books, magazines, and DVDs. In business contexts, boosters promote it as a means to gain insights into workplace interpersonal dynamics; in spirituality believers more commonly present it as a path to higher states of enlightenment. Proponents in both contexts say it can aid in self-awareness, self-understanding, and self-development. 

There has been limited formal psychometric analysis of the Enneagram and the peer-reviewed research that has been done is not accepted within the relevant academic communities. Though the Enneagram integrates some concepts that parallel other theories of personality, it has been dismissed by personality assessment experts as pseudoscience.

History

The origins and historical development of the Enneagram of Personality are matters of dispute. Wiltse and Palmer have suggested that similar ideas to the Enneagram of Personality are found in the work of Evagrius Ponticus, a Christian mystic who lived in 4th-century Alexandria in Egypt. Evagrius identified eight logismoi ("deadly thoughts") plus an overarching thought he called "love of self". Evagrius wrote, "The first thought of all is that of love of self (philautia); after this, [come] the eight." In addition to identifying eight deadly thoughts, Evagrius also identified eight "remedies" to these thoughts.

G. I. Gurdjieff (died 1949) has been credited with promoting the word enneagram and the enneagram figure (see Fourth Way enneagram). He did not, however, develop the nine personality types associated with the Enneagram of Personality. Instead, Gurdjieff used the enneagram figure for various other purposes, including sacred dances known as the Gurdjieff movements.

Oscar Ichazo (1931-2020) is sometimes credited as a principal source of the contemporary Enneagram of Personality which is largely derived from some of Ichazo's teachings, such as those on ego-fixations, holy ideas, passions, and virtues. The Bolivian-born Ichazo began teaching programs of self-development in the 1950s. His teaching, which he calls "Protoanalysis", uses the enneagram figure among many other symbols and ideas. Ichazo founded the Arica Institute -- which was originally based in Chile before moving to the United States -- and coined the term "Enneagram of Personality".

Claudio Naranjo (1932-2019) was a Chilean-born follower of Ichazo who developed and taught his own understanding of the Enneagram in the United States, principally at the Esalen Institute and to his students in Berkeley, California. Two of his followers were Jesuit priests who adapted the Enneagram for use in Christian spirituality. Ichazo disowned Naranjo and the other Enneagram teachers due to what he considered misinterpretations and misuses of the Enneagram. 

Naranjo's teachings became increasingly popular in the United States and elsewhere from the 1970s. Numerous other authors also published books on the Enneagram of Personality in the 1980s and 1990s. Those authors included Don Richard Riso (1987),  (1988), Eli Jaxon-Bear (1989), Elizabeth Wagele (1994), and Richard Rohr (1995). In 1994, the First International Enneagram Conference, attended by some 1,000 participants, was held at Stanford University and co-sponsored by the university's psychiatry department where psychiatrist, Enneagram author, and conference co-director  was teaching.

Analysis of Google search results over 16 years shows an increase in searches for the word "enneagram" from 2017. Additionally, social media accounts and podcasts about the Enneagram have increased, indicating a growing popularity among millennials. It has been suggested that the rise in popularity of the Enneagram parallels a renewed interest in astrology.

Figure
The enneagram figure is usually composed of three parts; a circle, an inner triangle (connecting 3-6-9), and an irregular hexagonal "periodic figure" (connecting 1-4-2-8-5-7). According to esoteric spiritual traditions, the circle symbolizes unity, the inner triangle symbolizes the "law of three" and the heptagram represents the "law of seven" (because 1-4-2-8-5-7-1 is the repeating decimal created by dividing one by seven in base 10 arithmetic). These three elements constitute the usual enneagram figure.

Nine types
The table below offers some of the principal characteristics of the nine types along with their basic relationships. This table expands upon Oscar Ichazo's ego fixations, holy ideas, passions, and virtues primarily using material from Understanding the Enneagram: The Practical Guide to Personality Types (revised edition) by Don Richard Riso and Russ Hudson as well as Charles Tart's Transpersonal Psychologies. Other theorists may disagree on some aspects. The types are normally referred to by their numbers, but sometimes their "characteristic roles" (which refers to distinctive archetypal characteristics) are used instead. Various labels for each type are commonly used by different authors and teachers. The "stress" and "security" points (sometimes referred to as the "disintegration" and "integration" points) are the types connected by the lines of the enneagram figure and are believed by some to influence a person in more adverse or relaxed circumstances. According to this theory, someone with a primary One type, for example, may begin to think, feel, and act more like someone with a Four type when stressed or a Seven type when relaxed.

Three triads of type patterns 
The nine Enneagram personality type patterns can be grouped into various triads of three types in which each of the types have some common personality issues. The most well-known of these triad groupings is also associated with the three "centers of intelligence" as taught by G. I. Gurdjieff. These three centers are traditionally known as the intellectual, emotional, and instinctual centers. Although each person is understood to always have all three centers active in their personality structure, certain personality issues are more associated with one of the centers depending on a person's dominant type pattern. In Enneagram of Personality teachings each of these centers has a particular association with one of the triads of personality types as follows:     

The intellectual center is particularly associated with types 5, 6, and 7. People with one of these dominant type patterns are largely motivated by "thinking" issues related to fear. This center is also associated with the nine ego-fixations and holy ideas as taught by Oscar Ichazo.
The emotional center is particularly associated with types 2, 3, and 4. People with one of these dominant type patterns are largely motivated by "feeling" and "image" issues related to anxiety and depression. This center is also associated with the nine passions and virtues as taught by Oscar Ichazo. 
The instinctual center is particularly associated with types 8, 9, and 1. People with one of these dominant type patterns are largely motivated by "gut" issues related to anger.

Wings
Most, but not all, Enneagram of Personality theorists teach that a person's basic type is modified, at least to some extent, by the personality dynamics of the two adjacent types as indicated on the enneagram figure. These two types are often called "wings". A person with the Three personality type, for example, is understood to have points Two and Four as their wing types. The circle of the enneagram figure may indicate that the types or points exist on a spectrum rather than as distinct types or points unrelated to those adjacent to them. A person may be understood, therefore, to have a core type and one or two wing types which influence but do not change the core type. Empirical research into wing theory by Anthony Edwards did not support the theory. Related to, but not the same, as the wing theory is Ichazo's theory involving the active, attractive, and function forces. According to him, the type is made from a starting point, referred to as the active force. In turn, the type is also led with an attractive force. This ends with the "function", where the result is the formation of a type in between the two. Naranjo said about the wings that a person "can easily see" their primary type as being between its adjacent wings.

Connecting lines
For some Enneagram theorists the lines connecting the points add further meaning to the information provided by the descriptions of the types. Sometimes called the "security" and "stress" points, or points of "integration" and "disintegration", some theorists believe these connected points also contribute to a person's overall personality. From this viewpoint, therefore, at least four other points affect a person's overall personality; the two points connected by the lines to the core type and the two wing points. The earlier teachings about the connecting lines are now rejected or modified by many Enneagram teachers, including Claudio Naranjo who developed them.

Instinctual subtypes
Each of the personality types is usually understood as having three "instinctual subtypes". These subtypes are believed to be formed according to which one of three instinctual energies of a person is dominantly developed and expressed. The instinctual energies are usually called "self-preservation", "sexual" (also called "intimacy" or "one-to-one"), and "social". On the instinctual level, people may internally stress and externally express the need to protect themselves (self-preservation), to connect with important others or partners (sexual), or to get along or succeed in groups (social). From this perspective, there are twenty-seven distinct personality patterns, because people of each of the nine types also express themselves as one of the three subtypes. An alternative approach to the subtypes looks at them as three domains or clusters of instincts that result in increased probability of survival (the "preserving" domain), increased skill in navigating the social environment (the "navigating" domain), and increased likelihood of reproductive success (the "transmitting" domain). From this understanding the subtypes reflect individual differences in the presence of these three separate clusters of instincts.

It is believed people function in all three forms of instinctual energies but one may dominate. According to some theorists, another instinct may also be well-developed and the third often less developed.

Type indicator tests
Enneagram type indicator tests have been developed by some of the more prominent teachers. One of these, the Riso–Hudson Enneagram Type Indicator (RHETI), was developed by Don Richard Riso and Russ Hudson in 1993. Their research focused on constructing it as a personality measurement instrument. The RHETI has been found to be of heuristic value but minimal scientific research has been conducted. 

The Stanford Enneagram Discovery Inventory was developed by late psychiatry professor David Daniels at Stanford University, and was later renamed the Essential Enneagram test. This assessment was employed to conduct various research studies, including on the personalities of identical twins.

A 2002 review of validation studies of various Enneagram tests found guarded support for their reliability and validity.

Research and criticism
While Enneagram teachings have attained some degree of popularity, they have also received criticism including accusations of being pseudoscience, subject to interpretation and difficult to test or validate scientifically, "an assessment method of no demonstrated reliability or validity". In 2011 the scientific skeptic Robert Todd Carroll included the Enneagram in a list of pseudoscientific theories that "can't be tested because they are so vague and malleable that anything relevant can be shoehorned to fit the theory".

A 2020 review of Enneagram empirical work found mixed results for the model's reliability and validity. The study noted that the ipsative version of the Riso-Hudson Enneagram Type Indicator (scores on one dimension decrease scores on another dimension) had troubles with validity, whereas the non-ipsative version of the test has been found to have better internal consistency and test-retest reliability. Furthermore, it was found that 87% of individuals were able to accurately predict their Enneagram type (before taking the test) by being read descriptions of each type.

In a Delphi poll of 101 doctoral-level members of psychological organizations such as the American Psychological Association, the Enneagram was among five psychological treatments and tests which were rated by at least 25% of them as being discredited for personality assessment. Experts familiar with the Enneagram rated it with a mean score of 4.14 (3.37 in the first round of the study) which is approximately an equivalent to the option "probably discredited" (3 = possibly discredited, 4 = probably discredited, 5 = certainly discredited).

The Enneagram has also received criticism from some religious perspectives. In 2000, the United States Conference of Catholic Bishops' Committee on Doctrine produced a draft report on the origins of the Enneagram to aid bishops in their evaluation of its use in their dioceses. The report identified aspects of the intersection between the Enneagram and Roman Catholicism which, in their opinion, warranted scrutiny with potential areas of concern, stating, "While the enneagram system shares little with traditional Christian doctrine or spirituality, it also shares little with the methods and criteria of modern science... The burden of proof is on proponents of the enneagram to furnish scientific evidence for their claims". Partly in response to some Jesuits and members of other religious orders teaching a Christian understanding of the Enneagram of Personality, a 2003 Vatican document called Jesus Christ, the Bearer of the Water of Life. A Christian Reflection on the 'New Age' said that the Enneagram "when used as a means of spiritual growth introduces an ambiguity in the doctrine and the life of the Christian faith".

See also
 Big Five personality traits
 Diamond Approach
 Myers–Briggs Type Indicator
 Personality psychology

References

Further reading

External links

International Enneagram Association website

Fourth Way enneagram
Personality typologies